An unfinished building is a building (or other architectural structure, as a bridge, a road or a tower) where construction work was abandoned or on-hold at some stage or only exists as a design.  It may also refer to buildings that are currently being built, particularly those that have been delayed or at which construction work progresses extremely slowly.

Many construction or engineering projects have remained unfinished at various stages of development.  The work may be finished as a blueprint or whiteprint and never be realised, or be abandoned during construction.

One of the best-known perennially incomplete buildings is Antoni Gaudí's basilica Sagrada Família in Barcelona. It has been under construction since 1882 and planned to be complete by 2026, Gaudí's death centenary.

Partially constructed buildings

There are numerous unfinished buildings that remain partially constructed in countries around the world, some of which can be used in their incomplete state but with others remaining as a mere shell. Some projects are intentionally left with an unfinished appearance, particularly the follies of the late 16th to 18th century.

Some buildings are in a cycle of near-perpetual construction, with work lasting for decades or even centuries. Antoni Gaudí's Sagrada Família in Barcelona, Spain, has been under construction for around 120 years, having started in the 1880s.  Work was delayed by the Spanish Civil War, during which the original models and parts of the building itself were destroyed.  Today, even with portions of the basilica incomplete, it is still the most popular tourist destination in Barcelona with 1.5 million visitors every year.  Gaudí spent 40 years of his life overseeing the project and is buried in the crypt. Germany's Cologne Cathedral took even longer to complete; construction started in 1248 and finished in 1880, a total of 632 years.

Buildings (and other architectural structures) never completed
Buildings that were never completed and remain in that state include:

 Duomo di Siena (Siena Cathedral), Italy
 Abbey of the Santissima Trinità, Venosa, Italy
 San Petronio Basilica, Bologna, Italy
 Goodwood House, West Sussex, England, UK
 Klosterneuburg Monastery, Austria
 Herrenchiemsee, Bavaria, Germany
 Prora, island of Rügen, Germany
 Woodchester Mansion, Stroud, Gloucester, England, UK
 Parliament House, Wellington, New Zealand
 Bishop Castle, San Isabel National Forest, Colorado, US
 Boldt Castle, Thousand Islands, New York, US
 National Monument, Edinburgh, Scotland, UK
 Ajuda National Palace, Lisbon, Portugal
 Cuenca Cathedral, Cuenca, Spain
 Jeddah Tower, Jeddah, Saudi Arabia
 Plaza Rakyat, Kuala Lumpur, Malaysia
 Ilot Voyageur, Montreal, Quebec, Canada
 Centro Financiero Confinanzas, Caracas, Venezuela
 Aspotogan Sea Spa, Nova Scotia, Canada (demolished)
 Chicago Spire, Chicago, Illinois, US
 Monumento a la Revolución, Mexico City, Mexico
 Beaumaris Castle, Anglesey, Wales, UK
 2 World Trade Center, New York City, US
  Trump International Hotel and Tower, Baku, Azerbaijan
In other cases, construction works proceeds extremely slowly, so one can also say form incomplete structures. Examples are:
 Cathedral of St. John the Divine, New York City, New York, US
 Sagrada Família, Barcelona, Spain
 Kaliakra transmitter, Cape Kaliakra, Bulgaria
 Westminster Cathedral, London, UK

Other unfinished structures
There are also roads, railway lines and channels which remained unfinished.

Roads
 MP-203, Madrid, Spain
 Interstate 710, Los Angeles County, California
 Route 11 Expressway, New London County, Connecticut
 LaSalle Expressway, Niagara County, New York
 South Mall Arterial/Dunn Memorial Bridge, Albany and Rensselaer, New York
 Seaford–Oyster Bay Expressway, Nassau County, New York
 Korean War Veterans Parkway (Richmond Parkway), Staten Island, New York
 Willowbrook Expressway/Parkway, Staten Island, New York
 Foothills Parkway, Tennessee
 Amstutz Expressway, Waukegan, Illinois
 Olimpijka in Poland
 M8 Bridge to Nowhere, Glasgow, Scotland
 The Foreshore Freeway Bridge in Cape Town, South Africa
 B 464 near Sindelfingen, Germany
 Strecke 46
 Strecke 77
 Strecke 85
 Interstate I-170 Baltimore, MD
 New Central Cross-Island Highway, Taiwan (including Provincial Highway 14, 18, 21)

Railway infrastructure
 Cincinnati Subway
 Mosel Railway (German: Moselbahn)
 Ahrtal Railway (German: Ahrtalbahn)
 Old Railway at Willebadessen
 Strategic Railway Embankment (German: Strategischer Bahndamm)

Arenas
 Deutsches Stadion
 Taipei Dome
 Nou Mestalla
 Lithuania National Stadium

Ferris wheels

 New York Wheel, New York City, New York, US
 Skyvue, Las Vegas, Nevada, US
 Turn of Fortune, Changzhou, China

Industrial plants
 Kramatorsk Metallurgical Plant 
 GRES-2 Power Station, Ekibastus

Nuclear power plants

 Crimean Atomic Energy Station, Shcholkine, Crimea
 Fast Breeder nuclear reactor SNR-300, Kalkar, Germany
 Lemoniz Nuclear Power Plant, Lemoniz, Spain
 Marble Hill Nuclear Power Plant, New Washington, IN, United States
 Satsop Nuclear Power Plant, Satsop, Washington, United States
 Stendal Nuclear Power Plant, Arneburg, Germany
 Unit 5, 6, 7, 8 of Chernobyl Nuclear Power Station
 Valdecaballeros Nuclear Power Plant, Valdecaballeros, Spain
 Lungmen Nuclear Power Plant, Taiwan
 Juragua Nuclear Power Plant, Cuba
 Żarnowiec Nuclear Power Plant, Poland

Electric power transmission systems
 Wolmirstedt HVDC-back-to-back plant
 Elbe Project
 HVDC Ekibastuz–Centre

Towers

 Watkins' Tower, London, UK
 Yekaterinburg TV Tower, Yekaterinburg, Russia (demolished)
 Berlin-Müggelberge TV Tower, Berlin, Germany
 Dubai Creek Tower, Dubai, United Arab Emirates
 Belgorod TV Tower, Belgorod, Russia
 Deutschlandsender Herzberg/Elster, Germany
 Wardenclyffe Tower, Shoreham, New York, USA
 Hakell Creative Educational Media, Haskell, Oklahoma, USA  at 35°53'0"N 95°46'15"W
 Galich TV Mast
Sathorn Unique Tower

Visions and plans

Many projects do not get to the construction phase, halted during or after planning.  Ludwig II of Bavaria commissioned several designs for Castle Falkenstein, with the fourth plan being vastly different from that of the first.  The first two designs were turned down, one because of costs and one because the design displeased Ludwig, and the third designer withdrew from the project.  The fourth and final plan was completed and some infrastructure was prepared for the site but Ludwig died before construction work began. The Palace of Whitehall, at the time the largest palace in Europe, was mostly destroyed by a fire in 1698.  Sir Christopher Wren, most famous for his role in rebuilding several churches after the Great Fire of London in 1666, sketched a proposed replacement for part of the palace but financial constraints prevented construction.

Even without being constructed, many architectural designs and ideas have had a lasting influence.  The Russian constructivism movement started in 1914 and was taught in the Bauhaus and other architecture schools, leading to numerous architects integrating it into their style.

Further examples

Construction never started
 Cenotaph for Sir Isaac Newton
 The Illinois
 Millennium Tower
 Palace of the Soviets
 Point Park Civic Center
 Project of Filippo Juvarra for the Royal Palace of Madrid
 Pyramid City
 Sky City 1000
 Tatlin's Tower
 Ville Contemporaine
 Volkshalle
Centennial Tower, Manila or Pasig Philippines
X-Seed 4000

Use of computer technology
Computer technology has allowed for 3D representations of projects to be shown before they are built.  In some cases the construction is never started and the computer model is the nearest that anyone will ever get to seeing the finished piece.  For example, in 1999 Kent Larson's exhibition "Unbuilt Ruins: Digital Interpretations of Eight Projects by Louis I. Kahn" showed computer images of designs completed by noted architect Louis Kahn but never built. Computer simulations can also be used to create prototypes of projects and test them before they are actually built; this has allowed the design process to be more successful and efficient.

See also
Unfinished work
List of visionary tall buildings and structures
Off-plan property

References

External links
Rick Edmondson's Unfinished Buildings
Unbuilt British motorways at Pathetic Motorways

Building engineering